The Binghamton Bearcats baseball team is a varsity intercollegiate athletic team of Binghamton University in Vestal, New York, United States. The team is a member of the America East Conference, which is part of the National Collegiate Athletic Association's Division I. The team plays its home games at Varsity Field in Vestal, New York. The Bearcats are coached by Tim Sinicki.

Year-by-year results
Below is a table of the program's yearly records since its inception.

See also
 List of NCAA Division I baseball programs

Notes

References

External links
 

 
1948 establishments in New York (state)